This is a partial list of people affiliated with Virginia Theological Seminary, located in Alexandria, Virginia, United States.

Faculty
 C. FitzSimons Allison (born 1927), bishop of South Carolina, church historian
 Michael J. Battle (born 1963), theologian, vice president and associate dean
 Armistead L. Boothe (1907–1990), state legislator, director of development
 Stephen Lloyd Cook (born 1962), Old Testament scholar
 Avery Dulles (1918–2008), visiting professor
 Mark Dyer (1930–2014), professor of theology and director of spiritual formation
 Reginald H. Fuller (1915–2007), New Testament scholar
 A. Katherine Grieb (born 1949), New Testament scholar
 Christopher Hancock (born 1954), theologian 
 John Johns (1796–1876), bishop of Virginia, president
 Lloyd A. Lewis (born 1947), New Testament scholar
 Ian Markham (born 1962), theologian, dean and president
 William Meade (1789–1862), bishop of Virginia, theologian and president
 Jack Moline (born 1952), rabbi, activist
 Robert Prichard (born 1949), church historian
 John H. Rodgers Jr. (1930–2022), systematic theologian
 Timothy F. Sedgwick (born 1946), theologian, associate dean
 Franklin Spencer Spalding (1865–1914), Episcopal Bishop of Utah
 Henry St. George Tucker (1874–1959), bishop of Virginia, pastoral theologian
 William Holland Wilmer (1782–1827), founding instructor and later president of the College of William and Mary

Alumni
 G. T. Abraham, former bishop of the Diocese of Nandyal in the Church of South India
 Peter Akinola (born 1944), primate of the Church of Nigeria
 C. FitzSimons Allison (born 1927), bishop of South Carolina
 Marc Handley Andrus (born 1956), bishop of California
 Scott Field Bailey (1916–2005), bishop suffragan of Texas, bishop of West Texas
 Stephen H. Bancroft (born 1946), dean of St. Paul’s Cathedral in Detroit, Michigan, executive director of the Detroit Office of Foreclosure Prevention and Response
 Middleton Barnwell (1882–1957), bishop of Idaho, bishop of Georgia, president of Boise Junior College
 Gregory T. Bedell (1817–1892), bishop of Ohio
 Scott Benhase (born 1957), bishop of Georgia
 Karl M. Block (1886–1958), bishop of California
 Francis Eric Bloy (1904–1993), bishop of Los Angeles
 William Jones Boone (1811–1864), missionary bishop of Shanghai
 William Jones Boone, Jr. (1846–1891), missionary bishop of Shanghai
 Samuel B. Booth (1883–1935), bishop of Vermont
 Walter Russell Bowie (1882–1969), priest, author
 Gregory Orrin Brewer, Bishop of Central Florida
 Phillips Brooks (1835–1893), preacher, author, bishop of Massachusetts
 George Browne (1933–1993), bishop of Liberia, archbishop of West Africa
 J. Jon Bruno (1946–2021), bishop of Los Angeles
 Mariann Edgar Budde (born 1959), bishop of Washington
 Charles Carpenter (1889–1969), bishop of Alabama
 Alison Cheek (1927-2019), one of the first women to be ordained to the priesthood in the Episcopal Church
 Charles E. Cheney (1836–1916), presiding bishop of the Reformed Episcopal Church
 Randolph Claiborne (1906–1986), bishop of Atlanta
 Lloyd Rutherford Craighill (1886–1971), bishop of Anking, China
 John Croneberger (born 1938), bishop of Newark
 John Culmer (1891–1963), priest, activist (BPDS alumnus)
 Clifton Daniel (born 1947), bishop of East Carolina
 James Parker Dees (1915–1990), presiding bishop of the Anglican Orthodox Church
 Jane Dixon (1937–2012), bishop of Washington
 Harry Doll (1903–1984), bishop of Maryland
 Denise Giardina (born 1951), novelist
 Robert Atkinson Gibson (1846–1919), bishop of Virginia
 Terrell Glenn (born 1958), bishop in the Anglican Mission in the Americas and the Anglican Church in North America
 W. A. R. Goodwin (1869–1939), rector of Bruton Parish Church in Williamsburg, "the father of Colonial Williamsburg"
 William Gordon (1918–1994), bishop of Alaska
 Walter H. Gray, Bishop of Connecticut
 A. Katherine Grieb (born 1949), New Testament scholar
 James Groppi (1930–1985), Roman Catholic priest, civil rights activist
 Edward Ambrose Gumbs, bishop of the Episcopal Diocese of the Virgin Islands
 Whit Haydn (born 1949), magician
 John Hines (1910–1997), bishop of Texas, presiding bishop of the Episcopal Church
 Samuel Howard (born 1951), bishop of Florida
 George Nelson Hunt, III, 11th Bishop of the Episcopal Diocese of Rhode Island
 James Addison Ingle (Yin Teh-sen) (1867–1903), missionary bishop of Hankow, China
 Carolyn Tanner Irish (born 1940), 10th bishop of Utah
 Stephen H. Jecko (1940–2007), 7th bishop of Florida
 Walter H. Kansteiner, III (born 1955), U.S. assistant secretary of state for African affairs
 Russell Kendrick (born 1961), 4th bishop of Episcopal Diocese of the Central Gulf Coast
 James Allen Latané (1831–1902), presiding bishop of the Reformed Episcopal Church
 Quigg Lawrence, bishop suffragan of the Anglican Diocese of Christ Our Hope
 Neil Lebhar, bishop of the Gulf Atlantic Diocese
 Lloyd A. Lewis (born 1947), New Testament scholar
 Samuel T. Lloyd III (born 1950), dean of the Washington National Cathedral, rector of Trinity Church, Boston
 Henry I. Louttit (born 1938), bishop of Georgia
 Thomas Mar Makarios (1926–2008), bishop of the Malankara Orthodox Church
 Joseph Mar Thoma (born 1931), metropolitan of the Mar Thoma Church
 James Robert Mathes, fourth Bishop of San Diego
 Frederica Mathewes-Green (born 1952), Eastern Orthodox author, activist
 Gerald Nicholas McAllister, bishop of the Episcopal Diocese of Oklahoma
 Martyn Minns (born 1943), missionary bishop of CANA
 Kate Moorehead (born 1970), dean of St. John’s Cathedral in Jacksonville, Florida
 George M. Murray (1919–2006), bishop of Alabama 
 Isaac Lea Nicholson (1844–1906), bishop of Milwaukee
 John Payne (1815–1874), bishop of Liberia
 Charles Clifton Penick (1843–1914), bishop of Cape Palmas, Africa
 William Stevens Perry (1832–1898), bishop of Iowa
 James Pike (1913–1969), bishop of California
 Leonidas Polk (1806–1864), planter, Confederate general, bishop of Louisiana
 Henry C. Potter (1835–1908), bishop of New York
 Noble C. Powell (1891–1968), bishop of Maryland
 William P. Remington (1879–1963), suffragan bishop of South Dakota and Pennsylvania, missionary bishop of Eastern Oregon
 Phoebe Alison Roaf, bishop of West Tennessee 
 John H. Rodgers Jr. (1930–2022), systematic theologian
 Sean W. Rowe (born 1975), bishop of Northwestern Pennsylvania
 Bennett Sims (1920–2006), bishop of Atlanta 
 Melissa M. Skelton (born 1951), bishop of New Westminster
 John Shelby Spong (born 1931), bishop of Newark
 Ernest M. Stires (1866–1951), bishop of Long Island
 Albert R. Stuart (1905–1973), bishop of Georgia
 William E. Swing (born 1936), bishop of California
 John T. Tarrant, bishop of South Dakota
 Philip Terzian (born 1950), editor of The Weekly Standard
 Beverley D. Tucker (1846–1930), bishop of Southern Virginia
 Francis Bland Tucker (1895–1984), Bible scholar, priest, hymn composer
 Henry St. George Tucker (1874–1959), missionary bishop of Osaka, bishop of Virginia, presiding bishop of the Episcopal Church
 John Poyntz Tyler (1862–1931), bishop of North Dakota
 John T. Walker (1925–1989), bishop of Washington
 Channing Moore Williams (1829–1910), missionary bishop of Shanghai, missionary bishop of Yedo in Japan
 Stephen D. Wood (born 1963), bishop of the Diocese of the Carolinas
 John F. Young (1820–1885), bishop of Florida

External links
Official site

References

Virginia Theological Seminary people